Nur Nurhan Çakmak, aka Nurhan Çakmak, (born June 3, 1981) is a Turkish women's football forward currently playing in the Second League for Kireçburnu Spor with jersey number 20. She was a member of the Turkish national team in the years 1999 and 2000.

Nur Nurhan Çakmak was born in Istanbul, Turkey on June 3, 1981.

Playing career

Club
Nurhan Çakmak obtained her license for Maltepe Yalıspor on November 10, 1999. She was loaned out to Onurspor, where she played between 1999 and 2003. The women's football leagues were suspended between 2004 and 2006. In the 2010–11 season, she was part of Bakırköy Gençlikspor, for which she appeared in 10 games and scored 12 goals. In 2011, Çaymak was transferred by Bakırköy Zaraspor. In two seasons, the team's captain was capped 13 times netting 10 goals. Currently, she plays for Kireçburnu Spor in Division 6 of the Second League.

International
Çakmak was admitted to the Turkey women's national under-18 football team and played in two 1999 UEFA Women's Under-18 Championship qualification round matches. She scored in her first match four goals against the Moldovian junior women and then one goal against the Slovenians.

She debuted in the senior women's national team in the friendly match against Israel on July 1, 1999, at which she netted a goal. Çakmak appeared at the 2001 UEFA Women's Championship qualification – Group 8 matches scoring one goal against Bosnia and Herzegovina and two honor goals of her team against Hungary. She capped ten times in total for the national tam until April 2000, playing in eight matches of the 2001 UEFA Women's Championship qualification round.

References

Living people
1981 births
Footballers from Istanbul
Turkish women's footballers
Turkey women's international footballers
Women's association football forwards
Kireçburnu Spor players
21st-century Turkish sportswomen